Friday Mbeke Godwin (born 30 June 2002) is a Nigerian professional footballer who plays for Nigerian club TBC FC.

References

External links 
 
 

2002 births
Living people
Nigerian footballers
Association football forwards
Nigerian expatriate footballers
Expatriate footballers in Belarus
Nigerian expatriate sportspeople in Belarus
FC Isloch Minsk Raion players
Sportspeople from Jos